Michael Zorc (born 25 August 1962) is a German former footballer who played as a central midfielder.

Nicknamed "Susi" in his early days because of his long hair, he spent his entire career with Borussia Dortmund, appearing in 572 competitive matches in 17 seasons and scoring 159 goals.

Subsequently, Zorc went on to serve as the club's sporting director.

Club career
Born in Dortmund, Zorc played 463 Bundesliga games for Borussia Dortmund (a club record) between 1981 and 1998, also being for many years the team's captain. He also ranked, at one time, their second all-time top goalscorer, thanks in part to his excellent penalty-taking ability. He made his professional debut on 24 October 1981 in a 2–0 away loss against SV Werder Bremen, becoming first choice from his second season onwards.

The tail-end of Zorc's career saw also his greatest successes, as Dortmund were twice crowned national champions as well as winning the 1996–97 UEFA Champions League and the Intercontinental Cup. He scored in double digits in seven seasons, including 15 apiece from 1994 to 1996.

Upon retiring at nearly 36, Zorc became sporting director of Borussia, still being in charge as the team won the national championship in 2002, 2011 and 2012 and playing a key part in pulling the club out of financial ruin alongside Hans-Joachim Watzke. He stepped down in June 2022, being replaced in the role by Sebastian Kehl.

International career
Zorc earned seven caps for Germany, but never made the squad for any international tournament. His debut came on 16 December 1992 at already 30, during a 3–1 friendly defeat to Brazil.

Personal life
Zorc's father, Dieter, played in the top division for VfL Bochum, and was an amateur international for Germany.

Honours
Borussia Dortmund
Bundesliga: 1994–95, 1995–96
DFL-Supercup: 1989, 1996
DFB-Pokal: 1988–89
UEFA Champions League: 1996–97
Intercontinental Cup: 1997
UEFA Cup runner-up: 1992–93
UEFA Super Cup runner-up: 1997

West Germany Youth
FIFA U-20 World Cup: 1981
UEFA European Under-18 Championship: 1981

See also
List of one-club men

References

External links

National team data 

1962 births
Living people
West German footballers
German footballers
Footballers from Dortmund
Association football midfielders
Bundesliga players
Borussia Dortmund players
Borussia Dortmund II players
UEFA Champions League winning players
Germany youth international footballers
Germany under-21 international footballers
Germany B international footballers
Germany international footballers
Borussia Dortmund non-playing staff